Chae Min-seo (born Jo Soo-jin; March 16, 1981) is a South Korean actress. Chae made her acting debut in 2002 with Champion, and has since played leading roles in horror film The Wig and the indies Loner (2008), Vegetarian (2010), Sookhee (2014) and Young Mother: What's Wrong with My Age? (2015). She actually shaved her head for the movie The Wig.

Filmography

Film

Television series

Variety show

References

External links 
 
 
 
 

1981 births
Living people
South Korean film actresses
South Korean television actresses
Place of birth missing (living people)